MOPE may refer to:

 Ministry of Population and Environment, a government ministry in Nepal.
 Ministry of Power and Energy, a government ministry in Sri Lanka.
 Mope, a song by the Bloodhound Gang.
 Mormon Pope, a slang term for the president of the Church of Jesus Christ of Latter-day Saints.
 Ministry of Public Education
 Ministry of Petroleum and Energy, a government ministry in Norway
"Most oppressed people ever", an assertion about Irish history coined by Liam Kennedy in Unhappy the Land
 Mope a 2019 film dramatizing the story of Stephen Clancy Hill.

See also

 Moped, a low power motorcycle with pedals